National Route 1B is a 135 km long Vietnamese highway. The starting point is in Dong Dang town, Cao Loc district, Lang Son province at the intersection of National highways 1 and 4A. The end of the route is at the crossroads near Gia Bay bridge in Thai Nguyen city. National Route 1B runs through the districts of Cao Loc, Van Quan, Binh Gia, Bac Son, Vo Nhai, and Dong Hy.

References 

National routes in Vietnam